Cloé Zoé Eyja Lacasse (born July 7, 1993) is a Canadian professional soccer player who plays as a forward for Portuguese club Benfica in the Campeonato Nacional Feminino club  and the Canada national team.

Early life
Lacasse began playing soccer at age five with the Sudbury Canadians before moving on to Brampton Brams United in 2010. She helped her high school team with the provincial OFSAA championship twice. In her youth, she made the national team for taekwondo, where she is a black belt, before deciding to focus solely on soccer at age 12.

College career
Lacasse began attending the University of Iowa, where she played for the women's soccer team on a scholarship. In her freshman season in 2011, she led the team in scoring with 12 goals, appearing in all 20 of the team's games, also being named Big Ten Freshman of the Week twice, and was named the team's Most Valuable Offensive Player and to the Big Ten All Freshman Team. In 2012, she was named to the NSCAA All-Great Lakes Region second team and was the co-winner of Iowa’s Most Valuable Player award and was named team’s Offensive Player of the Year again. In 2013, she was a Second-team All-Big Ten selection and a Second Team NSCAA All-Great Lakes Region selection. In her senior season, she was named to the All Big Ten First Team and was also a First Team NSCAA All-Great Lakes Region, First Team All-Big Ten, was named to the Big Ten All-Tournament team, and was named Iowa’s Offensive MVP for a fourth straight season. 
Lacasse was the school's top scorer during all her four seasons there. Lacasse finished her Iowa career tied for the school record with 112 points (43 goals and 26 assists), while ranking second all-time with 43 goals. She also finished tied for first in shots (306) and second in game-winning goals (13) and assists (26).

Club career
In 2012, she played with the Toronto Lady Lynx in the USL W-League.

After receiving offers to play for teams in the United States and Europe, Lacasse signed with Icelandic club ÍBV in the Úrvalsdeild kvenna in 2015. In 2016, she won the League Cup and in 2017, she won the Icelandic Cup with ÍBV. In 2018, the team were runner-ups in the Super Cup and she was named IBV's Player of the Year, and was she was named the league's best player by the newspaper Morgunblaðið.

After being spotted by a Portuguese agent while playing in Iceland, Lacasse signed a two-year contract with in July 2019 with Portuguese club Benfica in the Campeonato Nacional Feminino. On November 17, 2021, she became the first player to score a goal for a Portuguese club in the group stage of the UEFA Women's Champions League after scoring the opening goal in a 2-1 victory over BK Häcken FF. In 2021, she extended her contract until 2024. With Benfica, she is two-time Campeonato Nacional Feminino winner (2020–21, 2021–22), a two-time Taça da Liga winner (2020, 2021), and a two-time Supertaça de Portugal winner (2019, 2022).

International career
In August 2012, she attended a training camp with the Canada U20 team for the first time, but did not make the team's final roster for their upcoming matches.

After being granted granted Icelandic citizenship in June 2019, the head coach of the Icelandic national team, Jón Þór Hauksson, stated that she would be considered for a call-up for the team's next games. Lacasse applied to FIFA and UEFA to be eligible to represent Iceland internationally, however, it was confirmed in July 2020 that her application was denied, as it was ruled she did not meet FIFA's residency requirements to be eligible to represent a new national association.

In April 2021, she was called-up to Canada ahead of friendlies against England and Wales, but did not appear in either match. She made her debut for the national team on November 27, 2021 in a friendly against Mexico. She scored her first goal for the national team on October 6, 2022 in a 2-0 victory over Argentina in a friendly.

Career statistics

Club

International goals

Personal life
In 2017, she stated she was working towards applying for Icelandic citizenship, and said it would be an honour for her to be named to the Icelandic national team. In June 2019, the Icelandic Judicial Affairs and Education Committee recommended that Lacasse's application to be granted Icelandic citizenship be approved. On June 19, 2019, she was officially granted Icelandic citizenship.

Honours
ÍBV
Icelandic Women's Football Cup: 2017
League Cup Women A: 2016
Benfica
Campeonato Nacional Feminino: 2020–21, 2021-22
Taça da Liga Feminina: 2019–20, 2020–21
Supertaça de Portugal Feminina: 2019, 2022

References

External links
 
 
 
 Iowa Hewkeyes profile
 Cloé Lacasse at playmakerstats.com

1993 births
Living people
Soccer people from Ontario
Sportspeople from Greater Sudbury
Canadian women's soccer players
Icelandic women's footballers
Canadian emigrants to Iceland
Cloé Lacasse
Women's association football forwards
Iowa Hawkeyes women's soccer players
S.L. Benfica (women) footballers
Campeonato Nacional de Futebol Feminino players
Canadian expatriate sportspeople in Portugal
Expatriate women's footballers in Portugal
Canadian expatriate women's soccer players
Canadian expatriate sportspeople in the United States
Expatriate women's soccer players in the United States
Canadian expatriate sportspeople in Iceland
Expatriate women's footballers in Iceland
Toronto Lady Lynx players
Canada women's international soccer players